Skipjack is a 120 MW capacity off shore wind farm, proposed by Ørsted US Offshore Wind to be built on the Outer Continental Shelf Offshore Delaware, approximately  from the coast opposite Fenwick Island. It is projected that the project, which will provide power to Maryland, will be commissioned in 2022. It is one of the wind farm farm projects providing wind power to Maryland, the others being Marwind and Momentum Wind.

WEA

Infrastructure
The nacelles are also produced in France.

Ørsted U.S. Offshore Wind will partner with Tradepoint Atlantic, based in Port of Baltimore, to develop a logistics center to create a 50-acre staging center for on-land assembly, storage and loading out into deep waters.

The Port of Paulsboro on the Delaware River in New Jersey could become the site for the production the monopile foundations for turbines.

Ørsted has proposed using 1.5 acres of land in Fenwick Island State Park in Delaware as a transmission point.

ORECs
The Maryland Public Service Commission has authorized ORECs (offshore wind renewable energy certificates) for both Skipjack and Marwind.

Visibility from shore
Residents and business, particularly in Ocean City, Maryland, have raised concerns about the potential of negative impact of building a wind farm offshore, thus creating a landscape that could affect tourism.
The turbines have changed in size since the initial proposal by the predecessor of Orsted. They will be  feet tall.

See also
List of offshore wind farms in the United States
Ocean Wind
Wind power in Delaware
Wind power in Maryland

References

External links 
US Offshore Wind

Proposed wind farms in the United States
Offshore wind farms in the United States
Wind power in Delaware
Wind power in Maryland